Alveolo-palatal fricative is a class of consonants in some oral languages.  The consonants are sibilants, a variety of fricative. Their place of articulation is postalveolar. They differ in voicing.

Features 

Features of alveolo-palatal fricatives:

Examples

See also
Alveolo-palatal consonant
Alveolar consonant
Palatal consonant

References

Fricative consonants
Alveolo-palatal consonants
Oral consonants
Central consonants